Malešov is a market town in Kutná Hora District in the Central Bohemian Region of the Czech Republic. It has about 1,000 inhabitants. The historic centre is well preserved and is protected by law as an urban monument zone.

Administrative parts
Villages of Albrechtice, Maxovna, Polánka and Týniště are administrative parts of Malešov.

Geography
It lies in the Upper Sázava Hills. The Vrchlice Stream flows through the municipal territory. Vrchlice Reservoir and Hamerský Pond are located on the stream.

History
The first written mention of Malešov is from 1303. In 1424, Jan Žižka's army defeated the resisting Praguers in Battle of Malešov.

Sights

The Malešov Fortress is a notable medieval monument. It was probably built in the first half of the 14th century. During the Thirty Years' War, it was abandoned, but in 1666, it became the administrative centre of the estate, then owned by the Sporck family. In the 1820s, Empire style modifications were made. From the mid-19th century, the fortress area fell into disrepair and was abandoned. In 1850, one tower collapsed. At the end of the 19th century, the remains of the residential building were removed. The surviving core of the fortress was repaired in 2002–2003. It is one of the largest preserved residential towers of Czech fortresses.

The Malešov Castle was probably built in the first third of the 18th century. It is a small Baroque castle with a neoclassical façade.

The Church of Saint Wenceslaus is the landmark of the town square. It was built in the Baroque style in 1731–1733. It replaced a wooden chapel, destroyed by fire in 1729.

Notable people
Charles Jonas (1840–1896), Czech-American journalist, linguist and politician
Hugo Meisl (1881–1937), Austrian football coach

References

External links

Market towns in the Czech Republic
Populated places in Kutná Hora District